The European Lift Association (ELA) is a trade association based in Belgium that represents the lifts, escalators and moving walks associations of the European Union (EU) and the European Free Trade Area (EFTA).

References

External links

Trade associations based in Belgium
Pan-European trade and professional organizations
Organisations based in Brussels